Shashi Puri is an Indian actor who appeared in Hindi and Punjabi films. He also did a few Punjabi films including Saali Adhi Gharwali, Duja Viah, Udeekan Saun Diyan, Jako Rakhe Saiyan etc.

Filmography

Hindi

Grahan (1972)
Do Khiladi (1976) as Shibu
Dada (1979 film) as Shashi
Aayi Tere Yaad (1980)
Manokaamnaa (1980) as Vikas' brother (uncredited)
Maan Abhiman (1980) as Dr. Ravikant
Khoon Kharaba (1980) as Anil
Jazbaat (1980) as Deepak
Garam Khoon (1980)
Mangalsutra (1981) as Vijay's friend
Dard (1981)
Jwala Daku (1981) as Dr. Ravi
Begunaah Qaidi (1982)
Patthar Ki Lakeer (1982)
Tumhare Bina (1982) as Dutt's neighbour
Rustom (1982)
Avtaar (1983) as Ramesh Krishen
Arpan (1983) as Rakesh
Ek Din Bahu Ka (1983) as Madhu's Boyfriend
Marriage Bureau (1984)
Phulwari (1984) as Rajiv Mathur
 Haqeeqat (1985 film)        as Uma Shanker Baghi
Khushi (1986)
Amrit  (1986) as Shrikant Srivastav
Karma (1986) as Anil
Pati Paisa Aur Pyar (1987)
Ranima (1987)
Aurat Teri Yehi Kahani (1988) as Ketan
Dariya Dil (1988) as Ajay
Ajnabi Saaya (1989)
Apne Begaane (1989)
Ashrita (1990)
Aulad Ke Khatir (1990)
Jamai Raja (1990) as Dheeraj
Kasam Kali Ki (1991)
Bhabhi (1991) as Inspector Sudhir
Aaj Kie Aurat (1993) as Doctor Pankaj Sheth
Meri Aan (1993) as Advocate Mahesh Agarwal
Sangdil Sanam (1994) as Police Commissioner 
Jeena Nahin Bin Tere (1995)
Kaun Rokega Mujhe (1997) as Mohan
Dil Ke Jharoke Main (1997) as Advocate Suresh
Peenghan Pyar Diyan (1998)
Phir Wohi Awaaz (1998)

Punjabi
Ankhilli Mutiyar (1983) as Ratan Chaudhary
Duja Viah (1984)
Takraar (1984)
Jako Rakhe Saiyan (1986)
Suneha (1987)
Sharika (1989)
Hukumat Jatt Di (1990)
Udeekan Saun Diyan (1991)
Saali Adhi Gharwali (1993) as Amar

References

External links
 

20th-century Indian male actors
Living people
Male actors in Hindi cinema
Male actors in Punjabi cinema
Year of birth missing (living people)